The 4th United States Congress was a meeting of the legislative branch of the United States federal government, consisting of the United States Senate and the United States House of Representatives. It met at Congress Hall in Philadelphia, Pennsylvania, from March 4, 1795, to March 4, 1797, during the last two years of George Washington's presidency.  The apportionment of seats in the House of Representatives was based on the 1790 United States census. The Senate had a Federalist majority, and the House had a Democratic-Republican majority.

Major events
September 17, 1796: Washington's Farewell Address warned against partisan politics and foreign entanglements.
November 4 - December 7, 1796: 1796 United States presidential election: Incumbent vice president John Adams defeated Secretary of State Thomas Jefferson.

Major legislation

Treaties ratified 

 June 24, 1795: Treaty of London ("Jay's Treaty")
 March 7, 1796: Treaty of Madrid ("Pinckney's Treaty")

States admitted 
 June 1, 1796: Tennessee admitted as a state; formerly the Territory South of the River Ohio, Sess. 1, ch. 47,

Party summary

This was the first Congress to have organized political parties. Details on changes are shown below in the "Changes in membership" section.

Senate

House of Representatives

Leadership

Senate 

 President: John Adams (F)
 President pro tempore:
 Henry Tazewell (F), first elected December 7, 1795
 Samuel Livermore (F), first elected May 6, 1796
 William Bingham (F), first elected February 16, 1797

House of Representatives 
 Speaker: Jonathan Dayton (F)

Members
This list is arranged by chamber, then by state. Senators are listed by class, and representatives are listed by district.
Skip to House of Representatives, below

Senate
Senators were elected by the state legislatures every two years, with one-third beginning new six-year terms with each Congress. Preceding the names in the list below are Senate class numbers, which indicate the cycle of their election. In this Congress, Class 1 meant their term ended with this Congress, requiring re-election in 1796; Class 2 meant their term began in the last Congress, requiring re-election in 1798; and Class 3 meant their term began in this Congress, requiring re-election in 1800.

Connecticut 
 1. Oliver Ellsworth (F), until March 8, 1796
 James Hillhouse (F), from March 12, 1796
 3. Jonathan Trumbull Jr. (F), until June 10, 1796
 Uriah Tracy (F), from October 13, 1796

Delaware 
 1. Henry Latimer (F)
 2. John Vining (F)

Georgia 
 2. James Jackson (DR), until 1795
 George Walton (F), November 16, 1795 – February 20, 1796
 Josiah Tattnall (DR), from February 20, 1796
 3. James Gunn (F)

Kentucky 
 2. John Brown (DR)
 3. Humphrey Marshall (F)

Maryland 
 1. Richard Potts (F), until October 24, 1796
 John Eager Howard (F), from November 30, 1796
 3. John Henry (F)

Massachusetts 
 1. George Cabot (F), until June 9, 1796
 Benjamin Goodhue (F), from June 11, 1796
 2. Caleb Strong (F), until June 1, 1796
 Theodore Sedgwick (F), from June 11, 1796

New Hampshire 
 2. Samuel Livermore (F)
 3. John Langdon (DR)

New Jersey 
 1. John Rutherfurd (F)
 2. Frederick Frelinghuysen (F), until November 12, 1796
 Richard Stockton (F), from November 12, 1796

New York 
 1. Aaron Burr (DR)
 3. Rufus King (F), until May 23, 1796
 John Laurance (F), from November 9, 1796

North Carolina 
 2. Alexander Martin (DR)
 3. Timothy Bloodworth (DR)

Pennsylvania 
 1. James Ross (F)
 3. William Bingham (F)

Rhode Island 
 1. Theodore Foster (F)
 2. William Bradford (F)

South Carolina 
 2. Pierce Butler (DR), until October 25, 1796
 John Hunter (DR), from December 8, 1796
 3. Jacob Read (F)

Tennessee 
 1. William Cocke (DR), from August 2, 1796 (newly admitted state)
 2. William Blount (DR), from August 2, 1796 (newly admitted state)

Vermont 
 1. Moses Robinson (DR), until October 15, 1796
 Isaac Tichenor (F), from October 18, 1796
 3. Elijah Paine (F)

Virginia 
 1. Stevens Mason (DR)
 2. Henry Tazewell (DR)

House of Representatives

Connecticut 

All representatives were elected statewide on a general ticket.
 . Joshua Coit (F)
 . Chauncey Goodrich (F)
 . Roger Griswold (F)
 . James Hillhouse (F), until July 1, 1796
 James Davenport (F), from December 5, 1796
 . Nathaniel Smith (F)
 . Zephaniah Swift (F)
 . Uriah Tracy (F), until October 13, 1796
 Samuel W. Dana (F), from January 3, 1797

Delaware 
 . John Patten (DR)

Georgia 
Both representatives were elected statewide on a general ticket.
 . Abraham Baldwin (DR)
 . John Milledge (DR)

Kentucky 
 . Christopher Greenup (DR)
 . Alexander D. Orr (DR)

Maryland 
 . George Dent (F)
 . Gabriel Duvall (DR), until March 28, 1796
 Richard Sprigg Jr. (DR), from May 5, 1796
 . Jeremiah Crabb (F), until June 1, 1796
 William Craik (F), from December 5, 1796
 . Thomas Sprigg (DR)
 . Samuel Smith (DR)
 . Gabriel Christie (DR)
 . William Hindman (F)
 . William Vans Murray (F)

Massachusetts 
 . Theodore Sedgwick (F), until June, 1796
 Thomson J. Skinner (DR), from January 27, 1797
 . William Lyman (DR)
 . Samuel Lyman (F)
 . Dwight Foster (F)
 . Nathaniel Freeman Jr. (F)
 . John Reed Sr. (F)
 . George Leonard (F)
 . Fisher Ames (F)
 . Joseph Bradley Varnum (DR)
 . Benjamin Goodhue (F), until June 1796
 Samuel Sewall (F), from December 7, 1796
 . Theophilus Bradbury (F)
 . Henry Dearborn (DR)
 . Peleg Wadsworth (F)
 . George Thatcher (F)

New Hampshire 
All representatives were elected statewide on a general ticket.
 . Abiel Foster (F)
 . Nicholas Gilman (F)
 . John Sherburne (DR)
 . Jeremiah Smith (F)

New Jersey 
All representatives were elected statewide on a general ticket.

 . Jonathan Dayton (F)
 . Thomas Henderson (F)
 . Aaron Kitchell (DR)
 . Isaac Smith (F)
 . Mark Thomson (F)

New York 
 . Jonathan N. Havens (DR)
 . Edward Livingston (DR)
 . Philip Van Cortlandt (DR)
 . John Hathorn (DR)
 . Theodorus Bailey (DR)
 . Ezekiel Gilbert (F)
 . John E. Van Alen (F)
 . Henry Glen (F)
 . John Williams (DR)
 . William Cooper (F)

North Carolina 
 . James Holland (DR)
 . Matthew Locke (DR)
 . Jesse Franklin (DR)
 . Absalom Tatom (DR), until June 1, 1796
 William Strudwick (F), from December 13, 1796
 . Nathaniel Macon (DR)
 . James Gillespie (DR)
 . William Barry Grove (F)
 . Dempsey Burges (DR)
 . Thomas Blount (DR)
 . Nathan Bryan (DR)

Pennsylvania 
The 4th district was a plural district with two representatives.
 . John Swanwick (DR)
 . Frederick Muhlenberg (DR)
 . Richard Thomas (F)
 . Vacant until January 18, 1796
 John Richards (DR), from January 18, 1796
 . Samuel Sitgreaves (F)
 . Daniel Hiester (DR), until July 1, 1796
 George Ege (F), from December 8, 1796
 . Samuel Maclay (DR)
 . John Wilkes Kittera (F)
 . Thomas Hartley (F)
 . Andrew Gregg (DR)
 . David Bard (DR)
 . William Findley (DR)
 . Albert Gallatin (DR)

Rhode Island 
Both representatives were elected statewide on a general ticket.
 . Benjamin Bourne (F), until October 13, 1796
 Elisha R. Potter (F), from December 19, 1796
 . Francis Malbone (F)

South Carolina 
 . William L. Smith (F)
 . Wade Hampton (DR)
 . Lemuel Benton (DR)
 . Richard Winn (DR)
 . Robert Goodloe Harper (F)
 . Samuel Earle (DR)

Tennessee 
 . Andrew Jackson (DR), from December 5, 1796 (newly admitted state)

Vermont 
 . Israel Smith (DR)
 . Daniel Buck (F)

Virginia 
 . Robert Rutherford (DR)
 . Andrew Moore (DR)
 . George Jackson (DR)
 . Francis Preston (DR)
 . George Hancock (F)
 . Isaac Coles (DR)
 . Abraham B. Venable (DR)
 . Thomas Claiborne (DR)
 . William B. Giles (DR)
 . Carter B. Harrison (DR)
 . Josiah Parker (F)
 . John Page (DR)
 . John Clopton (DR)
 . Samuel J. Cabell (DR)
 . James Madison (DR)
 . Anthony New (DR)
 . Richard Brent (DR)
 . John Nicholas (DR)
 . John Heath (DR)

Non-voting members
  ("Southwest Territory," later "Tennessee") James White (DR), until June 1, 1796

Changes in membership 
The count below reflects changes from the beginning of this Congress

Senate 
There were 10 resignations, 2 new seats, and 1 election to replace an appointee. There was a 1-seat gain for both the Federalists and the Democratic-Republicans.

|-
| Georgia(2)
|  | James Jackson (DR)
| Resigned sometime in 1795
|  | George Walton (F)
| Appointed November 16, 1795
|-
| Georgia(2)
|  | George Walton (F)
| Interim appointment expired February 20, 1796, with an election
|  | Josiah Tattnall (DR)
| Elected February 20, 1796
|-
| Connecticut(1)
|  | Oliver Ellsworth (F)
| Resigned March 8, 1796
|  | James Hillhouse (F)
| Elected March 12, 1796
|-
| New York(2)
|  | Rufus King (F)
| Resigned May 23, 1796, having been appointed Minister to England
|  | John Laurance (F)
| Elected November 9, 1796
|-
| Massachusetts(2)
|  | Caleb Strong (F)
| Resigned June 1, 1796
|  | Theodore Sedgwick (F)
| Elected June 11, 1796
|-
| Massachusetts(1)
|  | George Cabot (F)
| Resigned June 9, 1796
|  | Benjamin Goodhue (F)
| Elected June 11, 1796
|-
| Connecticut(3)
|  | Jonathan Trumbull Jr. (F)
| Resigned June 10, 1796
|  | Uriah Tracy (F)
| Elected October 13, 1796
|-
| Tennessee(1)
| rowspan=2 | New seat
| rowspan=2 | Tennessee was admitted to the Union
|  | William Cocke (DR)
| rowspan=2 | Elected August 2, 1796
|-
| Tennessee(2)
|  | William Blount (DR)
|-
| Vermont(1)
|  | Moses Robinson (DR)
| Resigned October 15, 1796
|  | Isaac Tichenor (F)
| Elected October 18, 1796
|-
| Maryland(1)
|  | Richard Potts (F)
| Resigned October 24, 1796
|  | John E. Howard (F)
| Elected November 30, 1796
|-
| South Carolina(2)
|  | Pierce Butler (DR)
| Resigned October 25, 1796
|  | John Hunter (DR)
| Elected December 8, 1796
|-
| New Jersey(2)
|  | Frederick Frelinghuysen (F)
| Resigned November 12, 1796
|  | Richard Stockton (F)
| Elected November 12, 1796
|}

House of Representatives 
There were 9 resignations, 1 death of a Representative-elect, and 1 new seat. There was a 1-seat gain for both the Federalists and the Democratic-Republicans.

|-
| 
| Vacant
| Election was contested and then the apparent winner, James Morris, died July 10, 1795.The House then declared the seat won by the challenger.
|  | John Richards (DR)
| Seated January 18, 1796

|-
| 
|  | Jeremiah Crabb (F)
| Resigned sometime in 1796.
|  | William Craik (F)
| Seated December 5, 1796

|-
| 
|  | Benjamin Bourne (F)
| Resigned sometime in 1796.
|  | Elisha Potter (F)
| Seated December 19, 1796

|-
| 
|  | Theodore Sedgwick (F)
| Resigned sometime in June, 1796, having been elected U.S. Senator.
|  | Thomson Skinner (DR)
| Seated January 27, 1797

|-
| 
|  | Gabriel Duvall (DR)
| Resigned March 28, 1796, having been elected judge of the Supreme Court of Maryland.
|  | Richard Sprigg Jr. (DR)
| Seated May 5, 1796

|-
| 
|  | Absalom Tatom (DR)
| Resigned June 1, 1796.
|  | William Strudwick (F)
| Seated December 13, 1796

|-
| 
|  | Benjamin Goodhue (F)
| Resigned sometime in June 1796, having been elected U.S. Senator.
|  | Samuel Sewall (F)
| Seated December 7, 1796

|-
| 
|  | James Hillhouse (F)
| Resigned July 1, 1796, having been elected U.S. Senator.
|  | James Davenport (F)
| Seated December 5, 1796

|-
| 
| James White
| Served until June 1, 1796, when Tennessee was admitted to the Union.
| colspan=2 | District eliminated

|-
| 
| New seat
| Tennessee was admitted to the Union June 1, 1796.  Seat remained vacant until December 5, 1796.
|  | Andrew Jackson (DR)
| Seated December 5, 1796

|-
| 
|  | Daniel Hiester (DR)
| Resigned July 1, 1796.
|  | George Ege (F)
| Seated December 8, 1796

|-
| 
|  | Uriah Tracy (F)
| Resigned October 13, 1796, having been elected U.S. Senator.
|  | Samuel Dana (F)
| Seated January 3, 1797

|}

Committees
Lists of committees and their party leaders.

Senate

 Whole

House of Representatives

 Claims (Chairman: Uriah Tracy then Dwight Foster)
 Commerce and Manufactures (Chairman: Benjamin Goodhue then John Swanwick)
 Elections (Chairman: Abraham B. Venable)
 Revisal and Unfinished Business (Chairman: Nicholas Gilman)
 Rules (Select) 
 Ways and Means (Chairman: William Loughton Smith)
 Whole

Joint committees

 Enrolled Bills (Chairman: N/A then Richard Stockton)

Officers
 Architect of the Capitol: William Thornton

Senate
 Chaplain: William White, Episcopalian
 Doorkeeper: James Mathers 
 Secretary: Samuel A. Otis

House of Representatives 
 Chaplain: Ashbel Green, Presbyterian
 Clerk: John Beckley
 Doorkeeper: Thomas Claxton
 Reading Clerks: 
 Sergeant at Arms: Joseph Wheaton

See also 
 1794 United States elections (elections leading to this Congress)
 1794–95 United States Senate elections
 1794–95 United States House of Representatives elections
 1796 United States elections (elections during this Congress, leading to the next Congress)
 1796 United States presidential election
 1796–97 United States Senate elections
 1796–97 United States House of Representatives elections

Notes

References

External links
 Statutes at Large, 1789-1875
 Senate Journal, First Forty-three Sessions of Congress
 House Journal, First Forty-three Sessions of Congress
 Biographical Directory of the U.S. Congress
 U.S. House of Representatives: House History
 U.S. Senate: Statistics and Lists